John Fritsche may refer to:

John Fritsche Jr. (born 1991), American ice hockey player
John Fritsche Sr. (born 1966), American ice hockey player

See also
Fritsche (surname)